Glauco Tadeu Passos Chaves (born 11 February 1995), commonly known as Glauco, is a Brazilian footballer who currently plays as a goalkeeper for Oeste.

Career statistics

Club

Notes

References

1995 births
Living people
Brazilian footballers
Association football goalkeepers
América Futebol Clube (MG) players
Ipatinga Futebol Clube players
Oeste Futebol Clube players
Campeonato Brasileiro Série A players
Campeonato Brasileiro Série B players
Footballers from Belo Horizonte